The Museum of Southwestern Biology (MSB) is a research and teaching facility in the Department of Biology of the University of New Mexico (UNM). The museum's collections include vascular plants, invertebrates and vertebrates from the American West, Central and South America, and from throughout the world. It is open to visitors by appointment.

The Museum was said in 1997 to hold the largest collection of frozen tissue samples (85,000) in the western hemisphere and has assisted in the study of emerging zoonotic pathogens such as the Hantavirus and the Lassa virus.

Divisions

Amphibians and Reptiles

Arthropods

Birds

Fishes

Genomic Resources

Herbarium

Mammals

Significant Holdings

Holotypes 
 Ctenomys erikacuellarae MSB:Mamm:63391
 Monodelphis sanctaerosae MSB:Mamm:237023
 Ctenomys lessai MSB:Mamm:67111
 Tapecomys primus MSB:Mamm:239826
 Thomasomys andersoni MSB:Mamm:238679

Parasites

References

External links
 Museum of Southwestern Biology - official site
 MSB Collections Portal - search the museum's collection database

University museums in New Mexico
University of New Mexico
Natural history museums in New Mexico
Museums in Albuquerque, New Mexico